The Adventures of The Amazing Revelators is the second studio album by Australian blues-rock band The Revelators. The album was recorded in four days and released in March 2000.

At the ARIA Music Awards of 2001, the album was nominated for ARIA Award for Best Blues and Roots Album losing to More Gravy by Collard Greens & Gravy.

The album was released digitally on 28 April 2003.

Background
In a Head Records press release, it The Revelators' new project started in Joe Camilleri's back shed while working on the next The Black Sorrows' album.
Camilleri said; "Joe Creighton and James Black came over and I played them some songs I'd been working on and we decided to make another record. Joe had always wanted to do Van Morrison's "Beside You" and brought along a new song of his own called "Trust Me". Joined by Nicky Bomba on drums, we went to Woodstock Studios and cut 14 songs in 4 days."
Months passed before Camilleri played the songs again, saying "Finally I pulled out the tapes, gave them a spin, rang James and said this stuff is pretty good but we got to do some more recording." In March 2000 the Revelators reunited at Woodstock to cut 6 more sides and finally the CD was completed.

Track listing 
 CD track listing

Release history

References

External links
 "The Adventures of the Amazing" at discogs.com

2000 albums
The Revelators albums
Albums produced by Joe Camilleri